Antoinette Monsio Sayeh (born 12 July 1958 in Monrovia, Liberia) is a Liberian economist and Deputy Managing Director of the International Monetary Fund (IMF).  Sayeh served as the Director of the African Department at the IMF from July 14, 2008, to August 31, 2016.  She also was a Distinguished Visiting Fellow at the Center for Global Development.

Prior to her term at the IMF, she served from 2006 to 2008 as Minister of Finance in the cabinet of Liberian president Ellen Johnson Sirleaf. Sayeh was the second woman in Liberia's history to hold that position, the first being Ellen Johnson Sirleaf.

Sayeh is a graduate of Swarthmore College and The Fletcher School of Law and Diplomacy, where she received her MA and Ph.D. in International Economic Relations. Sayeh has also worked for the World Bank as country director for Benin, Niger, and Togo and worked on public finance management and civil service reform in Pakistan. According to the BBC, Sayeh "delighted international financial institutions" as Liberia's Minister of Finance.

From 2007, Sayeh was a member of the World Bank Group’s High Level Advisory Council on Women's Economic Empowerment, which was chaired by Danny Leipziger and Heidemarie Wieczorek-Zeul.

References

1958 births
Living people
Swarthmore College alumni
The Fletcher School at Tufts University alumni
Politicians from Monrovia
21st-century Liberian politicians
21st-century Liberian women politicians
Female finance ministers
Women government ministers of Liberia
Finance Ministers of Liberia
Center for Global Development